Beech is the common name for trees in the genus Fagus.

Beech may also refer to:

Plants

 Fagus sylvatica, the European or common beech
 Nothofagus, the genus of southern beeches
 Gmelina, the genus of Australian and tropical beech and beechwoods

Other uses
 Beech (surname), a surname
 Beech, Hampshire, England, a village and civil parish
 Beech, Iowa, USA, an unincorporated community
 Beech, West Virginia, USA, an unincorporated community
 Beech Aircraft Corporation, an aircraft manufacturer

See also
 Beach (disambiguation)
 The Beeches (disambiguation)
 Beeches (Frankfort, Kentucky), historic house